Urban agglomerations in Uttar Pradesh with populations over 100,000 are shown in the table below.


Urban agglomeration
In the India census of 2011, an urban agglomeration was defined as follows:

An urban agglomeration is a continuous urban spread constituting a town and its adjoining outgrowths (OGs), or two or more physically contiguous towns together with or without outgrowths of such towns. An Urban Agglomeration must consist of at least a statutory town and its total population (i.e. all the constituents put together) should not be less than 20,000 as per the 2001 Census. In varying local conditions, there were similar other combinations which have been treated as urban agglomerations satisfying the basic condition of contiguity.

Table
The urban agglomerations in Uttar Pradesh, with populations over 100,000, are noted below, with their constituent cities and towns.

 Abbreviations: M Corp. = Municipal corporation; NP = Nagar Palika/Nagar Panchayat; NPP = Nagar Palika Parishad; CT = Census town; OG = Out Growth; CB = Cantonment Board

See also
 List of cities in Uttar Pradesh
 List of urban local bodies in Uttar Pradesh

References

Urban agglomerations